The Dangerous Drugs (Forfeiture of Property) Act 1988, is a Malaysian laws which enacted to make provisions for offences in relation to property, and for the seizure and forfeiture of property, connected with activity related to offences under this Act, the Dangerous Drugs Act 1952, or any foreign law corresponding to these Acts or to the provisions for offences under these Acts; for assistance to foreign countries in relation to matters connected with dangerous drugs; and for matters connected with the aforesaid provisions.

Preamble
Preamble of the Act provides the following considerations:
WHEREAS action has been taken and further similar action is being threatened by a substantial body of persons both inside and outside Malaysia—
 to organize and carry out trafficking in dangerous drugs, including their importation into and exportation from Malaysia;
 to spread the dependence on dangerous drugs among various classes of people in Malaysia, thereby causing widespread detriment to public health, security, safety and morals; and
 to acquire property by trafficking in dangerous drugs and to utilize property for such trafficking;
AND WHEREAS the action taken and threatened is prejudicial to public order in Malaysia;
AND WHEREAS Parliament considers it necessary to stop such action;

Structure
The Dangerous Drugs (Forfeiture of Property) Act 1988, in its current form (1 December 2011), consists of 7 Parts containing 63 sections and 2 schedules (including no amendment).
 Part I: Preliminary
 Part II: Offences in Relation to Property
 Part III: Forfeiture of Property of Liable Persons
 Part IV: Arrest, Investigation and Seizure
 Part V: Forfeiture
 Part VI: Evidence and Procedure
 Part VII: Assistance to a Foreign Country
 Schedules

References

External links
 Dangerous Drugs (Forfeiture of Property) Act 1988 

1988 in Malaysian law
Malaysian federal legislation